The University of Wisconsin–Milwaukee Libraries Digital Collections was established in 2001 to provide remote (online) access to the library's unique resources. It serves the University of Wisconsin–Milwaukee academic community as well as the general public.

Preservation 
In May 2010 the UWM Libraries Digital Collections began working in conjunction with the American Geographical Society Library on a preservation project funded by the National Endowment for the Humanities. The project, entitled Saving and Sharing the AGS Library's Historic Nitrate Negative Images, encompasses "the digitization and rehousing of 56,000 nitrate photographic negatives that document landscapes, streetscapes, and human cultures around the world."

Collection development 
A project proposal for a new collection is submitted to the Digitization Unit and then reviewed by the UWM Libraries Digitization Oversight Committee.

Materials for approved projects are carefully selected by collection curators and subject specialists in the libraries and departments housing the source collections. UWM Libraries Digitization Unit is responsible for digitizing the selected materials according to established digitization standards and best practices. The digitized resources are researched and described to provide additional access points and to facilitate their discovery and use. CONTENTdm digital media management software is used to build online collections. Digital master files are stored at UWM Libraries digital repository to ensure their accessibility in the future. High resolution digital images can be ordered.

Current collections 
The UWM Libraries Digital Collections contain over 50,000 digital objects including photographic images, maps, and books drawn from the holdings of the American Geographical Society Library, the Archives, Special Collections, and the Curriculum Library.

List of digital collections

Holdings of the American Geographical Society Library 
 AGSL Digital Photo Archive – Asia and the Middle East.
 AGSL Digital Photo Archive – Africa.
 AGSL Digital Photo Archive – North and Central America
 AGSL Digital Photo Archive – South America
 AGSL Digital Map Collection
 Afghanistan: Images from the Harrison Forman Collection
 Cities Around the World
 Images of Russia and Caucasus Region 1929–1933
 Nazi Invasion of Poland in 1939
 Tibet – From the Collections of the AGS
 Transportation Around the World: 1911–1993
 Digital Sanborn Maps of Milwaukee 1894 and 1910

Holdings of the Archives 
 The March on Milwaukee Civil Rights History Project
 Architectural Drawings of Willis and Lillian Leenhouts
 Greetings from Milwaukee
 Milwaukee Neighborhoods Photos and Maps 1885–1992
 The Milwaukee Repertory Theater Photographic History
 Picturing Golda Meir
 UWM Photos Collection
 UWM Yearbook Collection

Holdings of the Special Collections 
 The Tse-Tsung Chow Collection of Chinese Scrolls and Fan Paintings / 周策縱書畫卷軸與扇面收藏集
 Aviation History: Selections from the George Hardie Collection
 UWM Book Arts Collection

Holdings of the Curriculum Library 
 Selections from the Curriculum Library's Historical Collection

Copyright and permissions 
All UWM Libraries Digital Collections are published by the University of Wisconsin–Milwaukee Libraries. Copyright © 2010 Board of Regents of the University of Wisconsin System. All rights reserved.

Images appearing on Wikipedia 
UWM Libraries Digital Collections images published on Wikipedia are under a Creative Commons Attribution-ShareAlike 3.0 Unported License.

Images appearing on the UWM Libraries website 
The low-resolution images available from the UWM Libraries Digital Collections website may be copied by individuals or libraries for personal use, research, teaching or any "fair use" as defined by copyright law.

Use fees are charged in addition to reproduction fees when images are published or redistributed. Use fees are negotiated on an individual basis. Requests to publish, exhibit, or redistribute the images included in the UWM Libraries Digital Collections must be obtained in writing.

See also 
 University of Wisconsin–Milwaukee Libraries

References

External links 
 University of Wisconsin-Milwaukee Libraries Digital Collections
 Saving and Sharing the AGS Library's Historic Nitrate Negative Images
 American Geographical Society Library
 UWM Libraries Archives
 UWM Libraries Special Collections
 UWM Libraries Curriculum Collection

American digital libraries
University of Wisconsin–Milwaukee